Rén is the Mandarin pinyin romanisation of the Chinese surname written  in Chinese character. It is romanised as Jen in Wade–Giles, and Yam or Yum in Cantonese. It is listed 58th in the Song dynasty classic text Hundred Family Surnames. As of 2008, it is the 59th most common surname in China, shared by 4.2 million people. In 2019 it was the 49th most common surname in Mainland China. 

The character 任 is typically pronounced, but as a surname is pronounced "rén," as well as in Ren County in Hebei.

Notable people

 Ren Guang (任光; died 29 AD), Eastern Han dynasty general, one of the Yuntai 28 generals
 Ren Shang (died 118), Eastern Han Protector General of the Western Regions
 Ren Jun (died 204), Eastern Han dynasty military officer
 Ren Yaxiang (died 662), Tang dynasty general and chancellor
 Ren Zhigu (fl. 692), chancellor of Empress Wu Zetian
 Ren Huan (died 927), Later Tang general and chancellor
 Ren Renfa (1254–1327), Yuan dynasty artist and irrigation expert
 Ren Xiong (1823–1857), painter of the Shanghai School
 Ren Xun (1835–1893), painter, brother of Ren Xiong
 Ren Bonian (1840–1896), painter of the Shanghai School, nephew of Ren Xiong and Ren Xun
 Ren Zhu (died 1867), Nien Rebellion leader
 Ren Fuchen (1884–1918), Soviet Red Army commander
 Ren Guang (1900–1941), composer
 Ren Bishi (1904–1950), early Communist leader
 Chih-Kung Jen (Ren Zhigong; 1906–1995), Chinese-American physicist
 Yam Kim-fai (任劍輝, 1913-1989),  opera actress
 Ren Mei'e (1913–2008), geologist
 Ren Zhongyi (1914–2005), Communist Party Chief of Liaoning and Guangdong province
 Ren Xinmin (1915–2017), aerospace engineer
 Ren Jiyu (1916–2009), philosopher, scholar
 Ren Rong (1917–2017), general and Communist Party Chief of Tibet Autonomous Region
 Ren Rongrong (任溶溶; born 1923), children's literature writer and translator
 Ren Jianxin (born 1925), former President of the Supreme People's Court of China
 Ren Zhengfei (born 1944), founder, chairman and CEO of Huawei
 Ren Wanding (born 1944), founder of Chinese Human Rights League
 Yum Sin-ling (Ren Shanning; born 1948), Hong Kong politician
 Joseph Yam (任志剛, born 1948), Hong Kong statistician 
 Ren Zhiqiang (born 1951), Chinese property tycoon and critic of the government
 Gish Jen (Ren Bilian; born 1955), American writer
 Simon Yam (Ren Dahua; born 1955), Hong Kong actor
 Ren Runhou (born 1957), former Vice Governor of Shanxi province
 Ren Jianxin (born 1959), founder and president of ChemChina
 Ren Yexiang (born 1961), actress
 Vivian Wing-Wah Yam (Ren Yonghua; born 1963), Hong Kong chemist
 Ren Xuefeng (1965–2019), Party Chief of Guangzhou and Deputy Party Chief of Guangdong and Chongqing
 Richie Jen (Ren Xianqi; born 1966), Taiwanese singer and actor
 Yam Kai-bong (任啟邦, born 1978), Hong Kong politician
 Edward Yum (Ren Liangxian; born 1979), Hong Kong politician, son of Yum Sin-ling
 Alex Yam (任梓铭, born 1981), Singaporean politician 
 Selina Jen (Ren Jiaxuan; born 1981), Taiwanese singer, member of S.H.E
 Ren Hui (born 1983), female speed skater, Olympic medalist
 Ren Han (born 1984), artist
 Ren Yongshun (born 1985), football player
 Ren Cancan (born 1986), world champion female boxer
 Ren Ye (born 1986), female field hockey player, Olympic medalist
 Ren Hang (1987–2017), photographer
 Ren Suxi (born 1988), Chinese actress and singer
 Ren Hang (born 1989), football player
 Ren Xin (born 1989), football player
 Ren Jialun (born 1989), Chinese actor and singer
 Ren Junfei (born 1990), basketball player
 Ren Hao (任豪) (born 1995), Chinese singer, member of R1SE
 Ren Ziwei (born 1997), speed skater

References

Chinese-language surnames
Individual Chinese surnames